Sangaku or San Gaku are Japanese geometrical problems or theorems on wooden tablets which were placed as offerings at Shinto shrines or Buddhist temples during the Edo period by members of all social classes.

History

The Sangaku were painted in color on wooden tablets (ema) and hung in the precincts of Buddhist temples and Shinto shrines as offerings to the kami and buddhas, as challenges to the congregants, or as displays of the solutions to questions. Many of these tablets were lost during the period of modernization that followed the Edo period, but around nine hundred are known to remain.

Fujita Kagen (1765–1821), a Japanese mathematician of prominence, published the first collection of sangaku problems, his Shimpeki Sampo (Mathematical problems Suspended from the Temple) in 1790, and in 1806 a sequel, the Zoku Shimpeki Sampo.

During this period Japan applied strict regulations  to commerce and foreign relations for western countries so the tablets were created using Japanese mathematics, developed in parallel to western mathematics. For example, the connection between an integral and its derivative (the fundamental theorem of calculus) was unknown, so Sangaku problems on areas and volumes were solved by expansions in infinite series and term-by-term calculation.

Select examples

 A typical problem, which is presented on an 1824 tablet in Gunma Prefecture, covers the relationship of three touching circles with a common tangent. Given the size of the two outer large circles, what is the size of the small circle between them? The answer is:

(See also Ford circle.)

 Soddy's hexlet, thought previously to have been discovered in the west in 1937, had been discovered on a Sangaku dating from 1822.
 One Sangaku problem from Sawa Masayoshi and other from Jihei Morikawa were solved only recently.

See also
 Equal incircles theorem
 Japanese theorem for concyclic polygons
 Japanese theorem for concyclic quadrilaterals
 Problem of Apollonius
 Recreational mathematics
 Seki Takakazu

Notes

References
 Fukagawa, Hidetoshi, and Dan Pedoe. (1989).  Japanese temple geometry problems = Sangaku. Winnipeg: Charles Babbage. ;   OCLC 474564475
 __ and Dan Pedoe. (1991)  Tōkyō : Mori Kitashuppan. ;   OCLC 47500620
 __ and Tony Rothman. (2008). Sacred Mathematics: Japanese Temple Geometry. Princeton: Princeton University Press. ;   OCLC 181142099
 Huvent, Géry.  (2008).   Sangaku. Le mystère des énigmes géométriques japonaises. Paris: Dunod. ;   OCLC 470626755
 Rehmeyer, Julie,  "Sacred Geometry", Science News, March 21, 2008.

External links

Sangaku (Japanese votive tablets featuring mathematical puzzles)
Japanese Temple Geometry Problem
Sangaku: Reflections on the Phenomenon
Sangaku Journal of Mathematics

Euclidean geometry
Japanese mathematics
Recreational mathematics